The Tour of South Africa was a stage cycling race in South Africa that was only held once, in 2011. It was part of UCI Africa Tour as a 2.2 event.

The race took place over eight days, and included seven stages.

Winners

References

Cycle races in South Africa
2011 establishments in South Africa
Recurring sporting events established in 2011
UCI Africa Tour races
Defunct cycling races in South Africa